This is a list of events in British radio during 1981.

Events

January
2 January – Dave Lee Travis presents his final edition of the Radio 1 Breakfast Show after two and a half years at the helm.
5 January – Mike Read succeeds Dave Lee Travis as presenter of the Radio 1 Breakfast Show.

February
 11 February – BBC Radio London begins broadcasting in stereo.
 19 February–9 April – Campus comedy serial Patterson, written by Malcolm Bradbury and Christopher Bigsby, receives its original broadcast – unusually for a sitcom – on BBC Radio 3.

March
No events.

April
No events.

May
No events.

June
No events.

July
4 July – BBC Radio Blackburn expands to cover all of Lancashire and is renamed accordingly.
27th July – Northsound Radio launched in Aberdeen from studios at 45 King's Gate.
July – The Home Secretary approves proposals for the creation of Independent Local Radio services in 25 more areas.

August
No events.

September
21 September – Steve Wright in the Afternoon is broadcast on BBC Radio 1 for the first time.
24 September – John Lade presents BBC Radio 3's Record Review for the final time. His last broadcast is the programme's 1,000th edition. Paul Vaughan takes over the programme the following week.

October
October – BBC Radio Deeside is expanded to cover all of north east Wales and is renamed BBC Radio Clwyd
4 October – The first edition of All Time Greats, presented by Desmond Carrington, is broadcast on BBC Radio 2. The programme, broadcast on Sunday lunchtimes, remains on air until the late 2000s.

November
23 November – BBC Radio Birmingham expands to cover the West Midlands, South Staffordshire, north Worcestershire and north Warwickshire and is relaunched as BBC WM.

December
Three months after launching, Essex Radio expands into mid-Essex when it starts broadcasting from transmitters located near Chelmsford.

Station debuts
27 July – Northsound Radio
1 September – Radio Aire
7 September – Centre Radio
12 September – Essex Radio
15 October – Chiltern Radio
27 October – Radio West
4 December – West Sound Radio

Closing this year

Programme debuts
19 February – Patterson, BBC Radio 3 (1981)
8 March – The Lord of the Rings (radio series), BBC Radio 4 (1981)
21 September – Steve Wright in the Afternoon, originally billed as Steve Wright, BBC Radio 1 (1981–1993, 1999–2022)

Continuing radio programmes

1940s
 Sunday Half Hour (1940–2018)
 Desert Island Discs (1942–Present)
 Down Your Way (1946–1992)
 Letter from America (1946–2004)
 Woman's Hour (1946–Present)
 A Book at Bedtime (1949–Present)

1950s
 The Archers (1950–Present)
 The Today Programme (1957–Present)
 Sing Something Simple (1959–2001)
 Your Hundred Best Tunes (1959–2007)

1960s
 Farming Today (1960–Present)
 In Touch (1961–Present)
 The World at One (1965–Present)
 The Official Chart (1967–Present)
 Just a Minute (1967–Present)
 The Living World (1968–Present)
 The Organist Entertains (1969–2018)

1970s
 PM (1970–Present)
 Start the Week (1970–Present)
 Week Ending (1970–1998)
 You and Yours (1970–Present)
 I'm Sorry I Haven't a Clue (1972–Present)
 Good Morning Scotland (1973–Present)
 Kaleidoscope (1973–1998)
 Newsbeat (1973–Present)
 The News Huddlines (1975–2001)
 File on 4 (1977–Present)
 Money Box (1977–Present)
 The News Quiz (1977–Present)
 Breakaway (1979–1998)
 Feedback (1979–Present)
 The Food Programme (1979–Present)
 Science in Action (1979–Present)

1980s
 Radio Active (1980–1987)

Births
25 May – Huw Stephens, Welsh radio presenter
1 July – Clemency Burton-Hill, classical music presenter
3 September – Fearne Cotton, broadcast presenter

Deaths
7 January – Alvar Liddell, 72, BBC Radio announcer and newsreader
10 February – Leonard Plugge, 91, commercial radio promoter and politician
13 April – Gwyn Thomas, 67, Welsh writer and broadcaster
23 September – Sam Costa, 71, crooner, voice actor and disc jockey
30 November – Val Gielgud, 81, pioneer director of broadcast drama

See also 
 1981 in British music
 1981 in British television
 1981 in the United Kingdom
 List of British films of 1981

References

Radio
British Radio, 1981 In
Years in British radio